The European Lady Junior's Team Championship was a European amateur team golf championship for women under 22 organized by the European Golf Association. The inaugural event was held in 1968. It was played every year until 1984, then every second year. It was discontinued in 2006.

Results

Source:

Results summary

Source:

See also
European Girls' Team Championship – amateur team golf championship for women up to 18 organized by the European Golf Association
European Ladies' Team Championship – amateur team golf championship for women organized by the European Golf Association
European Youths' Team Championship – discontinued amateur team golf championship for women up to 21 organized by the European Golf Association played 1968-2006

References

External links
European Golf Association: Full results

Amateur golf tournaments
Team golf tournaments
Women's golf tournaments
Recurring sporting events established in 1968
Recurring sporting events disestablished in 2006